Lebranchu is a French surname.

List of people with the surname 

 Marylise Lebranchu (born 1947), French politician
 Roger Lebranchu (born 1922), French rower

See also 

 Lebranche mullet

Surnames
French-language surnames
Surnames of French origin